Mount Soond is a peak 1 nautical mile (1.9 km) north of Bleclic Peaks in the Perry Range, Marie Byrd Land. Mapped by United States Geological Survey (USGS) from surveys and U.S. Navy air photos, 1959–65. Named by Advisory Committee on Antarctic Names (US-ACAN) for Robert T. Soond, geomagnetist/seismologist at Plateau Station, 1968.

Mountains of Marie Byrd Land